Princess Myat Phaya (born in Madras at 7 March 1886 – 21 July 1962), was a Burmese royal princess and Head of the Royal House of Konbaung. She is the third daughter of the last ruling king of Burma, King Thibaw and his queen Supayalat.

Biography

Myat Phaya was born on 7 March 1886 at Madras, British India. She returned to Burma from Ratnagiri in 1915. Later, she had served as Patron of the King Thibaw Funeral Committee in 1949, and the association for Buddhism as the National Religion in 1958.

Myat Phaya married her first husband, Prince Hteik Tin Kodawgyi, in 1921 and divorced him in 1930. He is the son of Maung Maung Thaung, by his wife Princess (Hteik Hteik Hkaung-tin) Aye, the Princess of War Nwe Gone, daughter of Crown prince Kanaung Mintha. She gave birth to their only daughter, Phaya Rita, also known as Hteik Su Gyi Phaya, she married her cousin Taw Phaya, a son of the Princess Myat Phaya Galay.

Myat Phaya married her second husband, Mya U (who died during the Japanese occupation), a lawyer on 25 June 1931. She died from cancer on 21 July 1962 at her home in Maymyo.

Gallery

References

External links 
 A rare meeting with the last of Burma's royals

1886 births
1962 deaths
Konbaung dynasty
People from Mandalay Region
Pretenders to the Burmese throne
Burmese people of World War II
Burmese people in British India